Comics studies (also comic art studies, sequential art studies or graphic narrative studies) is an academic field that focuses on comics and sequential art.  Although comics and graphic novels have been generally dismissed as less relevant pop culture texts, scholars in fields such as semiotics, aesthetics, sociology, composition studies and cultural studies are now re-considering comics and graphic novels as complex texts deserving of serious scholarly study.

Not to be confused with the technical aspects of comics creation, comics studies exists only with the creation of comics theory—which approaches comics critically as an art—and the writing of comics historiography (the study of the history of comics). Comics theory has significant overlap with the philosophy of comics, i.e., the study of the ontology, epistemology and aesthetics of comics, the relationship between comics and other art forms, and the relationship between text and image in comics.

Comics studies is also interrelated with comics criticism, the analysis and evaluation of comics and the comics medium.

Theorizing comics
Although there has been the occasional investigation of comics as a valid art form, specifically in Gilbert Seldes' The 7 Lively Arts (1924), Martin Sheridan's Comics and Their Creators (1942), and David Kunzle's The Early Comic Strip: Narrative Strips and Picture Stories in the European Broadsheet from c. 1450 to 1825 (1973), contemporary Anglophone comics studies in North America can be said to have burst onto the academic scene with both Will Eisner's Comics and Sequential Art in 1985 and Scott McCloud's Understanding Comics in 1993. Continental comics studies can trace its roots back to the pioneering work of semioticians such as Roland Barthes (particularly his 1964 essay "Rhetoric of the Image", published in English in the anthology Image—Music—Text) and Umberto Eco (particularly his 1964 book Apocalittici e integrati). These works were the first attempts at a general system of comics semiotics.

More recently, analysis of comics have begun to be undertaken by cognitive scientists, the most prominent being Neil Cohn, who has used tools from linguistics to detail the theoretical structure of comics' underlying "visual language", and has also used psychological experimentation from cognitive neuroscience to test these theories in actual comprehension. This work has suggested similarities between the way that the brain processes language and the way it processes sequential images. Cohn's theories are not universally accepted, with other scholars like Thierry Groensteen, Hannah Miodrag, and Barbara Postema offering alternative understandings.

Defining comics

Similar to the problems of defining literature and film, no consensus has been reached on a definition of the comics medium, and attempted definitions and descriptions have fallen prey to numerous exceptions.  Theorists such as Rodolphe Töpffer, R. C. Harvey, Will Eisner, David Carrier, Alain Rey, and Lawrence Grove emphasize the combination of text and images, though there are prominent examples of pantomime comics throughout its history.  Other critics, such as Thierry Groensteen and Scott McCloud, have emphasized the primacy of sequences of images.  Towards the close of the 20th century, different cultures' discoveries of each other's comics traditions, the rediscovery of forgotten early comics forms, and the rise of new forms made defining comics a more complicated task.

Composition studies
In the field of composition studies, an interest in comics and graphic novels is growing, partially due to the work of comics theorists but also due to composition studies' growing focus on multimodality and visual rhetoric. Composition studies theorists are looking at comics as sophisticated texts, and sites of complex literacy.

Gunther Kress defines multimodality as "the use of several semiotic modes in the design of a semiotic product or event, together with the particular way in which these mode are combined" or, more simply as "any text whose meanings are realized through more than one semiotic code".

Kristie S. Fleckenstein sees the relationship between image and text as "mutually constitutive, mutually infused"—a relationship she names "imageword". Fleckenstein sees "imageword" as offering "a double vision of writing-reading based on [the] fusion of image and word, a double vision of literacy".

Dale Jacobs sees the reading of comics as a form of "multimodal literacy or multiliteracy, rather than as a debased form of print literacy". According to Jacobs, comics can help educators to move "toward attending to multimodal literacies" that "shift our focus from print only to multiple modalities". He encourages educators to embrace a pedagogy that will give students skills to effectively negotiate these multiple modalities.

Comics historiography
Comics historiography (the study of the history of comics) studies the historical process through which comics became an autonomous art medium and an integral part of culture. An area of study is premodern sequential art; some scholars such as Scott McCloud consider Egyptian paintings and pre-Columbian American picture manuscripts to be the very first form of comics and sequential art. Another area of study is the 20th-century emergence of the subculture of comics readers and comicphilia, the passionate interest in comic books.  (A person with a passionate interest in comics is informally called a comicphile or comics buff.)

The first attempts at comics historiography began in the United States in the 1940s with the work of Thomas Craven, Martin Sheridan, and Coulton Waugh. It was not until the mid-1960s, with the publication of Jules Feiffer's The Great Comic Book Heroes, that the field began to take root. Historiography became an accepted practice in the 1970s with the work of Maurice Horn, Jim Steranko, Ron Goulart, Bill Blackbeard, and Martin Williams. The late 1990s saw a wave of books celebrating American comics' centennial. Other notable writers on these topics include Will Jacobs, Gerard Jones, Rick Marschall, and R. C. Harvey.

Educational institutions
Comics studies is becoming increasingly more common at academic institutions across the world. Some notable examples include: Ohio State University, University of Florida, University of Toronto at Mississauga, and University of California Santa Cruz, among others. In Britain, growing interest in comics has led to the establishment of a center for comics studies, the Scottish Centre for Comics Studies (SCCS) at the University of Dundee in Scotland. Beside formal programs and degrees, it is common to see individual courses dedicated to comics and graphic novels in many educational institutions.

Sol M. Davidson's New York University thesis, Culture and the Comic Strips, earned him the first PhD in comics in 1959, while in France, Jean-Christophe Menu was awarded a Doctorate in Art and Art Sciences in 2011 from Université Paris 1 Panthéon-Sorbonne after defending his thesis The Comics and its Double: Language and Frontiers of Comics: Practical, Theoretical and Editorial Prospects.

In 2012, the University of Oregon offered the first Comics and Cartoon Studies minor in the United States. This Comic Studies program is currently directed by Benjamin Saunders.

Teesside University began offering a BA in Comics and Graphic Novels in 2014, as well as an MA in Comics from 2018. They have since appointed a team of renowned comics practitioners including Fionnuala Doran, Julian Lawrence, Con Chrisoulis, Nigel Kitching and Tara McInerney.

The University of Lancaster started offering a PhD degree in comics studies in 2015. The same year French comics studies scholar Benoît Peeters (a student of Roland Barthes) was appointed as the UK's first ever comics professor at Lancaster University.

Learned societies
In addition to its presence in academic institutions, comics have also been studied in interdisciplinary learned society. The first US association dedicated to supporting the study of graphic narrative and sequential art was the Comics Studies Society (CSS), launched in 2014 at ICAF. Other anglophone societies that can be mentioned are British Consortium of Comics Scholars (BCCS, created in 2012 by Paul Davies), Scottish Centre for Comics Studies (SCCS) and Canadian Society for the Study of Comics (CSSC, created in October 2010 by Sylvain Rheault).

The CSSC, also known as Société Canadienne pour l'Étude de la Bande Dessinée (SCEBC), is a bilingual community of academics focused in Canadian scholars but open for international associates. Among other activities, CSSC/SCEBD organizes an academic conference during Toronto Comic Arts Festival.

Comics Studies Society

In November 2014, during the International Comic Arts Forum (ICAF), the California State University, Northridge professor Charles Hatfield made a motion to create the Comics Studies Society as an interdisciplinary association open to academics, non-academics or independent scholars, teachers, and students who had the goal of promoting the critical study of comics. 

At a meeting inside the Billy Ireland Cartoon Library & Museum, the CSS's first Executive Committee was officially voted and the CSS mais focuses were defined as "promoting the critical study of comics, improving comics teaching, and engaging in open and ongoing conversations about the comics world". CSS also organizes the Annual Conference of the Comics Studies Society since 2018.

Scholarly publications

Some notable academic journals specifically dedicated to comics studies are listed below in alphabetical order:

CuCo, Cuadernos de cómic (published by the Editorial de Universidad de Alcalá)
European Comic Art
ImageTexT (a peer reviewed, open-access journal that began in the spring of 2004 and is based at the University of Florida)
Image and Narrative (stylized as Image [&] Narrative, a peer-reviewed e-journal on visual narratology)
Inks: The Journal of the Comics Studies Society (published by the Ohio State University Press and organized by Comics Studies Society since 2017). The journal was nominated as Eisner Awards Best Comics-Related Periodical/Journalism in 2020.
International Journal of Comic Art
9a Arte Online at https://www.revistas.usp.br/nonaarte/
Journal of Graphic Novels and Comics
Revista Latinoamericana de Estudios sobre la Historieta
Studies in Comics
SANE: Sequential Art Narrative in Education (based at the University of Nebraska–Lincoln)
The Comics Grid: Journal of Comics Scholarship (first published in January 2011; an open-access, researcher-led, peer-reviewed academic journal published by the Open Library of Humanities)

Conferences
Although presentations dedicated to comics are commonplace at conferences in many fields, entire conferences dedicated to this subject are becoming more common. There have been conferences at SAIC (International Comic Arts Forum, 2009), MMU (The International Bande Dessinée Society Conference), UTS (Sequential Art Studies Conference), Georgetown, Ohio State (Festival of Cartoon Art), and Bowling Green (Comics in Popular Culture conference), and there is a yearly conference at University of Florida (Conference on Comics and Graphic Novels). Additionally, there is an annual Michigan State University Comics Forum, which brings together academics and professionals working in the industry. Notable regularly held movable conferences include the Comic Art and Comics Area of the Popular Culture Association of America and the conference of the International Society for Humor Studies.

The International Comic Arts Forum (ICAF), begun in 1995 at Georgetown University, has been described as one of the earliest academic initiatives for the study of comics. The German Gesellschaft für Comicforschung (ComFor, Society for Comics Studies) has organized yearly academic conferences since 2006. The Comics Arts Conference has met regularly since 1992 in conjunction with San Diego Comic-Con International and WonderCon. Another important conference is the annual International Graphic Novels and Comics Conference held since 2010 organized by British academics. This conference has been held in conjunction with the longer running International Bande Dessinée Society conference. Comics Forum, a UK-based community of international comics scholars, also holds an annual conference at Leeds Central Library; the first was held in 2009.

Comics studies awards

Eisner Award for Best Academic/Scholarly Work

Comics Studies Society Prizes 

Since 2018, Comics Studies Society awards comics studies, books and articles with five annual prizes: the CSS Article Prize, the Hillary Chute Award for Best Graduate Student Paper, the Gilbert Seldes Prize for Public Scholarship, the Charles Hatfield Book Prize, and the CSS Prize for Edited Book Collections. The nominated scholars don't need to be CSS members, but only members can send the nomination letters. All first-time publications during the previous calendar year are eligible (in case of translated books, is considered the year of English publication).

Winners

Charles Hatfield Book Prize 

2018 - Brannon Costello, by Neon Visions: The Comics of Howard Chaykin (Louisiana State University Press)
2019 - Lara Saguisag, by Incorrigibles and Innocents: Constructing Childhood and Citizenship in Progressive Era Comics (Rutgers University Press)
2020 - Jorge Santos, by Graphic Memories of the Civil Rights Movement: Reframing History in Comics (University of Texas Press)
2021 - Rebecca Wanzo, by The Content of Our Caricature: African American Comic Art and Political Belonging (New York University Press)
Honorable Mention: Jean Lee Cole, by How the Other Half Laughs: The Comic Sensibility in American Culture, 1895-1920 (University Press of Mississippi)
2022 - Susan E. Kirtley, by Typical Girls: The Rhetoric of Womanhood in Comic Strips (Ohio State University Press)
Honorable Mention: Esther De Dauw, by Hot Pants and Spandex Suits: Gender Representation in American Superhero Comic Books (Rutgers University Press)
Honorable Mention: Zack Kruse, by Mysterious Travelers: Steve Ditko and the Search for a New Liberal Identity (University Press of Mississippi)

CSS Article Prize 

2018 - Benoît Crucifix, by "Cut-up and Redrawn: Charles Burns's Swipe Files", published in Inks: The Journal of the Comics Studies Society
2019 - André M. Carrington, by "Desiring Blackness: A Queer Orientation to Marvel's Black Panther, 1998–2016", published in American Literature
2020 - Dan Mazur, by "Ibrahim Njoya, a Comics Artist in Colonial-Era Cameroon", published in The Comics Journal
2021 - Sydney Phillips Heifler, by "Romance Comics, Dangerous Girls, and the Importance of Fathers", published in Journal of Graphic Novels and Comics
Honorable Mention: Maite Urcaregui, by "(Un)documenting Single-Panel Methdologies and Epistemologies in the Non-fictional Cartoons of Eric J. García and Alberto Ledesma", published in Prose Studies: History, Theory, Critics
2022 - Vincent Haddad, by "Detroit vs. Everybody (Including Superheroes): Representing Race through Setting in DC Comics", published in Inks
Honorable Mention: Daniel Stein, by "Black Bodies Swinging: Superheroes and the Shadow Archive of Lynching" published in Closure
Honorable Mention: Justin Wigard, by "'The Fearless Spaceman Spiff, Interplanetary Explorer Extraordinaire': Parodic Imagination & the Pulp Aesthetic in Bill Watterson's Calvin & Hobbes", published in Inks

CSS Prize for Edited Book Collections 

2020 - Tahneer Oksman and Seamus O'Malley, by The Comics of Julie Doucet and Gabrielle Bell (University of Mississippi Press)
2021 - Anna F. Peppard, by Supersex: Sexuality, Fantasy, and the Superhero (University of Texas Press)
Honorable Mention: Frederick Luis Aldama, by Graphic Indigeneity: Comics in the Americas and Australasia (University Press of Mississippi)
Honorable Mention: Dominic Davies and Candida Rifkind, by Documenting Trauma in Comics: Traumatic Pasts, Embodied Histories, and Graphic Reportage (Palgrave Macmillan)
Honorable Mention: Martha Kuhlman and José Alaniz, by Comics of the New Europe: Reflections and Intersections (Leuven University Press)
2022 - Benjamin Woo and Jeremy Stoll, by The Comics World: Comic Books, Graphic Novels, and Their Publics (University Press of Mississippi)
Honorable Mention: Jamie Brassett and Richard Reynolds, by Superheroes and Excess: A Philosophical Adventure (Routledge)

Hillary Chute Award for Best Graduate Student Paper  

2018 - Alex Smith, by "Breaking Panels: Gay Cartoonists' Radical Revolt"
2019 - Isabelle Martin, by "'The Weight of Their Past': Reconstructing Memory and History through Reproduced Photographs in Thi Bui’s Graphic Novel The Best We Could Do"
2020 - Haniyeh Barahouie, by "Mapping the War in Zeina Abirached's A Game for Swallows: To Die, To Leave, To Return"
2021 - Maite Urcaregui, by "Political Geographies of Race in James Baldwin and Yoran Cazac's Little Man, Little Man"
Honorable Mention: Clémence Sfadj, by "Windows on Everyday Harlem: 'The Cartoons of Ollie Harrington'"
2022 - Kay Sohini, by "The Peculiarity of Time"
Honorable Mention: Bryan Bove, by "It Can't All Be Sorrow: Confronting Trauma Through Television in Marvel's WandaVision"
Honorable Mention: Adrienne Resha, by "Good Is Not a Thing You Are, It's a Thing Superheroes Do: Kamala Khan and the Identity Pause in Ms. Marvel, Superhero Bildungsroman"

Gilbert Seldes Prize for Public Scholarship 

2019 - Osvaldo Oyola, by "Guess Who’s Coming Home for the Holidays: Intergenerational Conflict in Bitch Planet", The Middle Spaces, "'I AM (not) FROM BEYOND!': Situating Scholarship & the Writing 'I'", The Middle Spaces, and "YA = Young Avengers: Asserting Maturity on the Threshold of Adulthood", The Middle Spaces
2020 - Zoe D. Smith, by "4 Colorism, or, the Ashiness of it All" and "4 Colorism, or, White Paper/Brown Pixels", Women Wrote About Comics
2021 - Zachary J.A. Rondinelli, by "#WelcomeToSlumberland Social Media Research Project"
Honorable Mention: Anna F. Peppard, by "(Behold?) The Vision's Penis: The Presence of Absence in Mutant Romance Tales"
2022 - Ritesh Badu, by "Civilized Monsters: These Savage Shores and the Colonialist Cage"
Honorable Mention: Vincent Haddad, by "'That Wingnut is Insane': Reality vs. Fictionality in Conspiracy Comics"
Honorable Mention: The Oh Gosh, Oh Golly, Oh Wow! Podcast with Anna Peppard, Christopher Maverick, J. Andrew Deman, and Shawn Gilmore, episode 5, "Excalibur #5: 'Send in the Clowns'"

See also

 Alternative comics
 Childhood studies
 Glossary of comics terminology
 Graphic medicine
 Comics in education
 Comics poetry
 Conference on College Composition and Communication
 "How to Read Nancy"
 Institute for Comics Studies
 Joe Kubert School of Cartoon and Graphic Art
 List of comics critics
 University Press of Mississippi: Great Comics Artists Series / Comics and Popular Culture category
 Wilhelm Busch Museum

People
 Donald Ault
 Peter Coogan
 Mark Evanier
 Thierry Groensteen
 Ian Gordon
 Jeet Heer
 James Kakalios
 Shirrel Rhoades
 Peter Sanderson
 Jim Steranko
 Michael Uslan
 Rebecca Wanzo
 Kent Worcester

References

Works cited

Further reading

 Ayaka, Carolene and Ian Hague (eds.), Representing Multiculturalism in Comics and Graphic Novels, Routledge, 2014.
 Bongco, Mila, Reading Comics: Language, Culture, and the Concept of the Superhero in Comic Books, Routledge, 2014.
 Bonura, Massimo, Provenzano, Federico, Teorie e Storia del Fumetto. Il fumetto e le sue teorie comunicative, Palermo, Zap edizioni, 2017.
 Bramlett, Frank (ed.), Linguistics and the Study of Comics, Springer, 2012.
 Bramlett, Frank, Roy Cook and Aaron Meskin (eds.), The Routledge Companion to Comics, Routledge, 2016.
 Burke, Liam, The Comic Book Film Adaptation: Exploring Modern Hollywood's Leading Genre, University Press of Mississippi, 2015.
 Caswell, Lucy Shelton and Jared Gardner, Drawing the Line: Comics Studies and INKS, 1994–1997, Ohio State University Press, 2017.
 Claudio, Esther and Julio Cañero (eds.), On the Edge of the Panel: Essays on Comics Criticism, Cambridge Scholars Publishing, 2015.
 Cohn, Neil (ed.), The Visual Narrative Reader, Bloomsbury, 2016.
 Cowling, Sam and Wesley Cray, Philosophy of Comics: An Introduction, Bloomsbury, 2022.
 
 Denson, Shane, Christina Meyer, Daniel Stein, Transnational Perspectives on Graphic Narratives: Comics at the Crossroads, Bloomsbury, 2013.
 DiPaolo, Marc, War, Politics and Superheroes: Ethics and Propaganda in Comics and Film, McFarland, 2011. 
 Dong, Lan (ed.), Teaching Comics and Graphic Narratives: Essays on Theory, Strategy and Practice, McFarland, 2012.
 Duncan, Randy and Matthew J. Smith, The Power of Comics: History, Form and Culture, Continuum, 2009.
 Earle, Harriet, Comics, Trauma, and the New Art of War, University Press of Mississippi, 2017.
 Fawaz, Ramzi, Deborah Whaley, and Shelley Streeby (eds.), Keywords for Comics Studies, NYU Press, 2021.
 Fuchs, Wolfgang J. and Reinhold Reitberger, Comics: Anatomy of a Mass Medium, Little Brown & Co, 1972.
 Gravett, Paul, Comics Art, Yale University Press, 2013.
 Groensteen, Thierry, Comics and Narration, University Press of Mississippi, 2013.
 Groensteen, Thierry, The System of Comics, University Press of Mississippi, 2009.
 Hague, Ian, Comics and the Senses: A Multisensory Approach to Comics and Graphic Novels, Routledge, 2014.
 Hatfield, Charles, Alternative Comics: An Emerging Literature, University Press of Mississippi, 2005.
 Hatfield, Charles and  Bart Beaty (eds.), Comics Studies: A Guidebook, Rutgers University Press, 2020.
 Heer, Jeet and Kent Worcester (eds.), A Comics Studies Reader, University Press of Mississippi, 2009.
 Kukkonen, Karin, Studying Comics and Graphic Novels, Wiley-Blackwell, 2013.
 Kukkonen, Karin, Contemporary Comics Storytelling, University of Nebraska Press, 2013.
 Lund, Martin, Re-Constructing the Man of Steel: Superman 1938–1941, Jewish American History, and the Invention of the Jewish–Comics Connection, Palgrave Macmillan, 2016.
 Magnussen, Anne and Hans-Christian Christiansen (eds.), Comics & Culture: Analytical and Theoretical Approaches to Comics, Museum Tusculanum Press, 2000.
 McLaughlin, Jeff (ed.), Comics as Philosophy, University Press of Mississippi, 2005.
 McLaughlin, Jeff (ed.), Graphic Novels as Philosophy, University Press of Mississippi, 2017.
 Meesters, Gert, "Creativity in Comics. Exploring the Frontiers of the Medium by Respecting Explicit Self-imposed Constraints," in Tony Veale, Kurt Feyaerts, Charles Forceville (ed.), Creativity and the Agile Mind: A Multi-Disciplinary Study of a Multi-Faceted Phenomenon, Walter de Gruyter, 2013, pp. 275–292.
 Miller, Ann and Bart Beaty (eds.), The French Comics Theory Reader, Leuven University Press, 2014.
 Miodrag, Hannah, Comics and Language: Reimagining Critical Discourse on the Form, University Press of Mississippi, 2013.
 Pizzino, Christopher, Arresting Development: Comics at the Boundaries of Literature, U of Texas Press, 2016.
 Postema, Barbara, Narrative Structure in Comics: Making Sense of Fragments, Boydell & Brewer, 2013.
 Reynolds, Richard, Super Heroes: A Modern Mythology, University Press of Mississippi, 1994.
 Saraceni, Mario, The Language of Comics, Routledge, 2003.
 Schmitz-Emans, Monika (ed.), Comic und Literatur: Konstellationen, Walter de Gruyter, 2012.
 Smith, Matthew and Randy Duncan (eds.), Critical Approaches to Comics: Theories and Methods, Routledge, 2012.
 Smith, Matthew and Randy Duncan (eds.), The Secret Origins of Comics Studies, Routledge, 2017.
 Stein, Daniel and Jan-Noël Thon (eds.), From Comic Strips to Graphic Novels: Contributions to the Theory and History of Graphic Narrative, Walter de Gruyter, 2015.
 Weiner, Robert G. (ed.), Graphic Novels and Comics in Libraries and Archives: Essays on Readers, Research, History and Cataloging, McFarland, 2010.
 Wolk, Douglas, Reading Comics: How Graphic Novels Work and What They Mean, Da Capo Press, 2008.

Historiography 
 Barrier, J. Michael and Martin Williams. A Smithsonian Book of Comic-Book Comics (Smithsonian Institution Press, 1982) 
 Blackbeard, Bill and Martin Williams, editors. The Smithsonian Collection of Newspaper Comics (Smithsonian Institution Press, 1977) 
 Blackbeard, Bill and Dale Crain. The Comic Strip Century: Celebrating 100 Years of an American Art Form (Kitchen Sink Press, 1995) 
 Booker, M. Keith (ed.), Comics through Time: A History of Icons, Idols, and Ideas, Santa Barbara, California: ABC-CLIO, 2014.
 Booker, M. Keith (ed.), Encyclopedia of Comic Books and Graphic Novels, Santa Barbara, California: ABC-CLIO, 2010.
 Couperie, Pierre C. and Maurice Horn, editors. A History of the Comic Strip (Crown Publishers, 1968)
 Craven, Thomas, editor. Cartoon Cavalcade: A Collection of the Best American Humorous Cartoons from the Turn of the Century to the Present (Simon & Schuster, 1943)
 Feiffer, Jules. The Great Comic Book Heroes: The Origins and Early Adventures of the Classic Super-Heroes of the Comic Books (Dial Press, 1965)
 Gabilliet, Jean-Paul, Of Comics and Men: A Cultural History of American Comic Books, University Press of Mississippi, 2010.
 Goulart, Ron. The Adventurous Decade: Comic Strips In the Thirties (Crown Publishers, 1975) 
 Goulart, Ron. The Great Comic Book Artists (St. Martin's Press, 1986) 
 Goulart, Ron. Ron Goulart's Great History of Comic Books: the Definitive Illustrated History from the 1890s to the 1980s (Contemporary Books, 1986) 
 Goulart, Ron. The Encyclopedia of American Comics: From 1897 to the Present (Facts on File, 1991) 
 Goulart, Ron. The Comic Book Reader's Companion: an A-Z Guide to Everyone's Favorite Art Form (Harper Perennial, 1993) 
 Goulart, Ron. The Funnies: 100 Years of American Comic Strips (Adams Media Corp, 1995) 
 Goulart, Ron. Comic Book Encyclopedia: The Ultimate Guide to Characters, Graphic Novels, Writers, and Artists in the Comic Book Universe (HarperCollins, 2004) 
 Hajdu, David, The Ten-Cent Plague: The Great Comic-Book Scare and How It Changed America, Picador, 2009 (originally Farrar, Straus and Giroux, 2008).
 Harvey, R. C. The Art of the Funnies: An Aesthetic History (University Press of Mississippi, 1994) 
 Harvey, R. C. The Art of the Comic Book: An Aesthetic History (University Press of Mississippi, 1996) 
 Kunzle, David, The Early Comic Strip: Narrative Strips and Picture Stories in the European Broadsheet from c. 1450 to 1825, University of California Press, 1973,
 Jacobs, Will and Gerard Jones. The Comic Book Heroes: The First History of Modern Comic Books: From the Silver Age to the Present (Crown Publishers, 1985) 
 Jones, Gerard, Men of Tomorrow: Geeks, Gangsters, and the Birth of the Comic Book, Basic Books, 2005.
 Marschall, Rick. America's Great Comic Strip Artists: From the Yellow Kid to Peanuts (Abbeville Press, 1989) 
 Petersen, Robert S., Comics, Manga, and Graphic Novels: A History of Graphic Narratives, ABC-CLIO, 2011.
 Pustz, Matthew (ed.), Comic Books and American Cultural History: An Anthology, Continuum, 2012.
 Sheridan, Martin. Comics and Their Creators: Life Stories of American Cartoonists, Hale, Cushman & Flint, 1942.
 Steranko, Jim. The Steranko History of Comics vol. 1 (Supergraphics, 1970) 
 Steranko, Jim. The Steranko History of Comics vol. 2 (Supergraphics, 1972) 
 Walker, Brian. The Comics: Before 1945 (Harry N. Abrams, 2004) 
 Walker, Brian. The Comics: Since 1945 (Harry N. Abrams, 2006) 
 Waugh, Colton. The Comics (Macmillan, 1947)
 Williams, Paul and James Lyons (eds.), The Rise of the American Comics Artist: Creators and Contexts, University Press of Mississippi, 2010.
 Wright, Bradford W., Comic Book Nation: The Transformation of Youth Culture in America, Johns Hopkins University Press, 2001.

External links
 The National Association of Comic Art Educators' page
 ComicsResearch.org
 Comics in the Classroom
 The Institute for Comics Studies (defunct)
 Comics Research--annotated bibliographies for comics scholarship
 Comic book annotations and bibliographies
 Online Bibliographies of Anime and Manga research
 Neil Cohn's Visual Language Lab website
 Cognitive Comics: A Constructivist Approach to Sequential Art
 The Comics Grid: Journal of Comics Scholarship
 The Comics Studies Society (CSS)
 Inks: their journal (publisher's site)
 The Japan Society for Studies in Cartoons and Comics (JSSCC, Nihon manga gakkai)
 Association des Critiques et journalistes de Bande Dessinée
 CuCo, Cuadernos de Cómic
 Revista Latinoamericana de Estudios sobre la Historieta

 
Literary theory
Postmodern theory
Popular culture studies